The following elections occurred in the year 1892.

Asia

Japan
 1892 Japanese general election

Europe

Denmark
 1892 Danish Folketing election

Portugal
 1892 Portuguese legislative election

United Kingdom
 1892 Chelmsford by-election
 1892 Leeds South by-election
 1892 Rossendale by-election
 1892 United Kingdom general election

North America

Canada
 1892 Edmonton municipal election
 1892 Manitoba general election
 1892 New Brunswick general election
 1892 Quebec general election

United States
 1892 United States presidential election
 1892 United States Senate elections
 1892 United States House of Representatives elections
 United States House of Representatives elections in California, 1892
 United States House of Representatives elections in South Carolina, 1892
 1892 South Carolina gubernatorial election
 1892 New York state election
 Omaha Platform

Oceania

Australia
 1892 East Adelaide colonial by-election
 1892 Perth colonial by-election

New Zealand
 1892 Bruce by-election
 1892 City of Wellington by-election
 1892 Rangitikei by-election

South America

Argentina
 1892 Argentine presidential election

See also
 :Category:1892 elections

1892
Elections